Fan death is an urban myth that people have died as a result of running an electric fan in a closed room with no open windows. While the supposed mechanics of fan death are impossible given how electric fans operate, belief in fan death persisted to the mid-2000s in South Korea, and also to a lesser extent in Japan.

Origins of the belief
Where the idea came from is unclear, but fears about electric fans date back to their introduction to Korea, with stories dating to the 1920s and 1930s warning of the risks of nausea, asphyxiation, and facial paralysis from the new technology.

One conspiracy theory is that the South Korean government created or perpetuated the myth as propaganda to curb the energy consumption of South Korean households during the 1970s energy crisis, but Slate reports that the myth is much older than that – probably as far back as the introduction of electric fans in Korea, and cites a 1927 article about "Strange Harm from Electric Fans".

Proposed explanations

Hyperthermia (heat stress)
Air movement will increase sweat evaporation, which cools the body. But in extreme heat and high humidity, sweat evaporation becomes ineffective, so the heat stress placed on the body increases, potentially speeding the onset of heat exhaustion and other detrimental conditions: The American Environmental Protection Agency (EPA) discourages people from using fans in closed rooms without ventilation when the heat index (a combination of temperature and humidity) is above 32 °C (89.6 °F). The EPA does, however, approve of using a fan if a window is open and it is cooler outside, or in a closed room when the heat index is lower.

Hypothermia
Hypothermia is abnormally low body temperature caused by inadequate thermoregulation. As the metabolism slows down at night, one becomes more sensitive to temperature, and thus supposedly more prone to hypothermia. Most at risk would be someone in frail health over an extended period of time. Investigative autopsies of purported fan death victims showed that issues like heart problems and alcoholism may have been exacerbated by the temperature drop, thus allowing the victims to succumb to that illness more easily.

Asphyxiation
It is alleged that fans may cause asphyxiation by oxygen displacement and carbon dioxide intoxication. In the process of human respiration, inhaled fresh air is exhaled with a lower concentration of oxygen gas (O2) and higher concentration of carbon dioxide gas (CO2), causing a gradual reduction of O2 and buildup of CO2 in a completely unventilated room. However, this is true of any room without ventilation, and a running fan will not greatly improve or worsen the problem.

Media coverage
During the summer, mainstream South Korean news sources regularly report alleged cases of fan death. A typical example is this excerpt from the July 4, 2011, edition of The Korea Herald, an English-language newspaper:

This article also noted there was "no evidence" the fan caused the death, however.  University of Miami researcher Larry Kalkstein says a misunderstanding in translation resulted in his accidental endorsement of the fan death theory, which he denies is a real phenomenon.

Ken Jennings, writing for Slate, says that based on "a recent email survey of contacts in Korea", opinion seems to be shifting among younger Koreans: "A decade of Internet skepticism seems to have accomplished what the preceding 75 years could not: convinced a nation that Korean fan death is probably hot air."

Philip Hiscock, when interviewed by The Star, suggested that fan death's prevalence in Korean beliefs and its potential as a euphemism contributed to the idea's continuation, "Traditional fairy legends (or) contemporary UFO abductions are used for things that are either inadmissible or untellable in present company. The fact that fan death is well known in Korea (and) can be used to postpone explanations or cover up the truth is very interesting and a very traditional way of going about things."

South Korean government
The Korea Consumer Protection Board (KCPB), a South Korean government-funded public agency, issued a consumer safety alert in 2006 warning that "asphyxiation from electric fans and air conditioners" was among South Korea's five most common summer accidents or injuries, according to data they collected. The KCPB published the following:

See also

 Culture of South Korea
 Culture-bound syndrome
 List of common misconceptions

References

Asphyxia
Causes of death
Cultural aspects of death
Culture-bound syndromes
Ventilation fans
Fear
Misconceptions
Sleep in mythology and folklore
South Korean folklore
Superstitions of Asia
Superstitions of Japan
Technology folklore